Oryzias curvinotus or the Hainan medaka is a species of ricefish which is found in Quang Ninh Province in northern Vietnam and Hainan, Guangdong and Hong Kong in southern China. It is found in both fresh and brackish water. This species was described as Aplocheilus curvinotus in 1927 by J.T. Nichols and C.H. Pope with the type locality given as Nodoa, Hainan Island, China.

References

Oryzias
Taxa named by John Treadwell Nichols
Taxa named by Clifford H. Pope
Fish described in 1927